Buddha Institute of Technology, Gorakhpur also known as BIT, Gorakhpur, established in 2009, is a private degree engineering college situated in Gorakhpur, Uttar Pradesh, India. It offers undergraduate and post-graduate engineering programs in electronics and communication engineering, mechanical engineering, civil engineering, information technology and computer science.

Courses
 B.Tech
 M. Tech
 Diploma
 B. Pharma
 D. Pharma.
 ITI

See also
 Madan Mohan Malaviya University of Technology

References

2009 establishments in Uttar Pradesh
Education in Gorakhpur